The 1990 Texas Tech Red Raiders football team represented Texas Tech University as a member of the Southwest Conference (SWC) during the 1990 NCAA Division I-A football season. In their fourth season under head coach Spike Dykes, the Red Raiders compiled a 4–7 record (3–5 against SWC opponents), finished in fourth place in the conference, and were outscored by opponents by a combined total of 356 to 322. The team played its home games at Clifford B. and Audrey Jones Stadium in Lubbock, Texas.

Schedule

References

Texas Tech
Texas Tech Red Raiders football seasons
Texas Tech Red Raiders football